Plastique is an obsolete term for plastic explosive.

Plastique may also refer to:

 Plastique (character), DC comic book character 
 Plastique (Arrowverse), a version of the character in the Arrowverse
 "Plastique" (The Flash episode), an episode of The Flash
 "Plastique" (Smallville), an episode of Smallville centered on another version of the character
 Plastique Tiara, Vietnamese-American drag queen

See also 
 Plastic (disambiguation)